Microsoft Knowledge Base (MSKB) was a website repository of over 150,000 articles made available to the public by Microsoft Corporation for technical support. It contained information on many problems encountered by users of Microsoft products. Each article bore an ID number and articles were often referred to by their Knowledge Base (KB) ID. Microsoft Windows update names typically start with the letters "KB", in reference to the specific article on that issue. Previously, the "Q" letter was used.

As of 2020, Microsoft began to discontinue the Knowledge Base service.  Some content was migrated to the learn.microsoft.com sub-site.

kbalertz.com was a website that provided email alerts of new articles, although Microsof had also provided a similar service.

See also
 MSDN Library
 Windows Update

References

External links
 

Microsoft culture
Microsoft websites